Herbert Frazier Murray (December 29, 1923 – July 12, 1999) was a United States district judge of the United States District Court for the District of Maryland.

Education and career
Born in Waltham, Massachusetts, Murray was in the United States Army Air Forces from 1943 to 1945. He received a Bachelor of Arts degree from Yale College in 1947 and a Bachelor of Laws from the University of Maryland School of Law in 1951. He was a law clerk Judge William Calvin Chesnut of the United States District Court for the District of Maryland from 1951 to 1952. He was in private practice in Baltimore, Maryland from 1952 to 1954. He was an Assistant United States Attorney of the District of Maryland from 1954 to 1956. He was in private practice in Baltimore from 1956 to 1971.

Federal judicial service
Murray was nominated by President Richard Nixon on July 19, 1971, to a seat on the United States District Court for the District of Maryland vacated by Judge Roszel Cathcart Thomsen. He was confirmed by the United States Senate on July 29, 1971, and received his commission the same day. He assumed senior status on December 31, 1988. Murray served in that capacity until his death on July 12, 1999, in Baltimore.

References

Sources

1923 births
1999 deaths
Judges of the United States District Court for the District of Maryland
United States district court judges appointed by Richard Nixon
20th-century American judges
United States Army Air Forces soldiers
20th-century American lawyers
Judges of the United States Foreign Intelligence Surveillance Court
Assistant United States Attorneys
University of Maryland Francis King Carey School of Law alumni
Yale College alumni